The 2006–07 Scottish League Cup was the 61st staging of the Scotland's second most prestigious football knockout competition, also known for sponsorship reasons as the CIS Insurance Cup.

The competition began on 9 August 2006, and was won by Hibernian, who defeated Kilmarnock 5–1 in the final.

Schedule

First round
Tuesday, 8 – Wednesday, 9 August 2006.

Second round
Tuesday, 22 – Wednesday, 23 August 2006.

Third round
Tuesday, 19 – Wednesday, 20 September 2006.

Fourth round
Tuesday, 7 – Wednesday, 8 November 2006.

Semi-finals
Tuesday, 30 January – Wednesday, 31 January 2007 – SF1 at Fir Park, SF2 at Tynecastle

Final
Sunday, 18 March 2007 – at Hampden Park

First round

Second round

Third round

Quarter-finals

Semi-finals

Final

Player stats

Top goalscorers

Player of the round

Scottish League Cup seasons
League Cup